is a Japanese voice actress and narrator from Hakodate, Hokkaido. Matsui was a member of Production Baobab for 20 years before becoming a freelancer.

Matsui is most notable for the roles of Uru Chie in High School! Kimengumi, Rem Ayanokōji in Dream Hunter Rem, Katsumi Liqueur in Silent Möbius, Chiyoko Wato in The Three-Eyed One, Runrun in Mahōjin Guru Guru, Rabby in Gall Force Eternal Story, Roux Louka in Mobile Suit Gundam ZZ, Dorothy Catalonia in Mobile Suit Gundam Wing, Azusa Shiratori in Ranma ½, Miyako Todaiji in Kamikaze Kaito Jeanne, and Sonoko Suzuki in Detective Conan.

Filmography

TV series
1980s
 Cat's Eye (1983) – Biron
 Attacker You! (1984) – Nami Hayase
 Chikkun Takkun (1984) – Mukko
 Persia, the Magic Fairy (1984) – Theresa
 High School! Kimengumi (1985) – Uru Chie
 Sherlock Hound (1985) – Nicol
 Dancouga (1985) – Shirley McGovern
 Doteraman (1986) – Manami Suzuki
 Mobile Suit Gundam ZZ (1986) – Roux Louka
 Ultra B (1987) – Takemi Aoba
 Norakuro-kun (1987) – Rika Sawaguchi
 Mister Ajikko (1987) – Taro, Jiro
 Little Lord Fauntleroy (1988) - Bridget
 Osomatsu-kun (1988) – Jūshimatsu/Totoko
 Idol Densetsu Eriko (1989) – Rei Asagiri
 The Adventures of Peter Pan (1989) – Wendy Darling
 Jushin Liger (1989) – Yui Kamishiro
 Magical Hat (1989) – Spin
 Ranma ½ (1989) – Azusa Shiratori, Yotaro
1990s
 NG Knight Lamune & 40 (1990) – Lesqua / Arara Cafe au Lait
 Little Twin Stars (1990) – Will
 Robin Hood no Daibōken (1990) – Marian Lancaster
 The Three-Eyed One (1990) – Chiyoko Wato
 Goldfish Warning! (1991) – Yurika Sugadaira
 Marude Dameo (1991) – Sakiko Yamada
 Ashita e Free Kick (1992) – Raiza Nakamori
 Tekkaman Blade (1992) – Lille
 Cooking Papa (1992) – Shoji
 Crayon Shin-chan (1992) – Yukimi
 Mahōjin Guru Guru (1994) – Run Run
 Tottemo! Luckyman (1994) – Miyo Kireida
 Mobile Suit Gundam Wing (1995) – Dorothy Catalonia
 Sorcerer Hunters (1995) – Barubara
 Virtua Fighter (1995–1996) – Pai Chan
 Detective Conan (1996) – Sonoko Suzuki
 Kiko-chan's Smile (1996) – Shoko Dojima
 Martian Successor Nadesico (1996) – Inez Fressange
 VS Knight Lamune & 40 FIRE (1996) – Lesqua/Arara Cafe au Lait
 Hare Tokidoki Buta (1997) – Mama
 The Kindaichi Case Files (1997) – Ryoko Saotome, 
 Silent Möbius (1998) – Katsumi Liqueur
 Gregory Horror Show (1999) – Lost Doll
 Kamikaze Kaito Jeanne (1999) – Miyako Todaiji
2000s
 Seven of Seven (2002) – Melody Honey
 Naruto (2002) – Yoshino Nara
 D.C. ~Da Capo~ (2003) – Koyomi Shirakawa
 Gankutsuou: The Count of Monte Cristo (2004) – Victoria de Danglars
 Gift ~eternal rainbow~ (2004) – Nene Himekura
 Zatch Bell! (2004) – Penny
 Black Jack (2004) – Saeki (ep. 26), Konomi Kuwata (ep. 59)
 Yu-Gi-Oh! Duel Monsters GX (2005) – Ran Kochō
 Moeyo Ken (2005) – Toshie Hijikata
 Air Gear (2006) – Rika Noyamano
 Death Note (2006) – Naomi Misora
 Futari wa Pretty Cure Splash Star (2006) – Mizu Shitataare
 Kirarin Revolution (2006) – Chairman Higashiyama
 Doraemon (2007) – Sumire Hoshino
 Kekkaishi (2007) – Princess
 Itazura na Kiss (2008) – Machiko Irie (Naoki's Mother)
 Ojarumaru (2008) – Kaminari Kisuke
 Higurashi When They Cry (2006) – Aiko Maebara
 Hamtaro (2006) - Oshare (replaced Ikue Ōtani for 1 episode) 
2010s
 Kamisama Kiss (2012) – Demon Hag
 Toriko (2012) – Love, Malisman
 Silver Spoon (2013) – Komaba's Mother
 One Piece (2013) – Monet, Sind
 HappinessCharge PreCure! (2014) – Ribbon
 Aikatsu (2015) – Kukuru Seto
 Kamisama Kiss 2 (2015) – Onikiri, Izanami
 Nobunaga no Shinobi (2016) – Matsu

Original video animation (OVA)
 Dream Hunter Rem (1985) – Rem Ayanokōji
 Gall Force (1986) – Rabby
 Dangaioh (1987) – Pai Thunder
 Ten Little Gall ForceSuper Deformed Double Feature (1988) – Rabby
 Gall Force Earth Chapter (1989) – Sandy Newman
 Kimagure Orange Road: Hurricane! Akane the Shape-changing Girl (1989) – Akane
 Lupin III (2005) – Emily O'brien (Leader of Angel Tactics)
 Rhea Gall Force (1989) – Sandy Newman
 Riding Bean (1989) – Rally Vincent
 Devil Hunter Yohko (1990) – Reiko
 Mobile Suit Gundam 0083: Stardust Memory (1991) – Lucette Audevie
 Compiler (1994) – Compiler
 Master of Martial Hearts (2008) – Suzuko Iseshima

Film animation
Hare Tokidoki Buta (1988) – Mama
Windaria (1989) – Princess Ahnas
Urusei Yatsura: Always, My Darling (1991) – Lupika
Case Closed series (1997–) – Sonoko Suzuki
Martian Successor Nadesico: The Motion Picture – Prince of Darkness (1998) – Inez Fressange
Pretty Cure All Stars DX2: Light of Hope☆Protect the Rainbow Jewel! (2010) – Mizu Shitataare
Lupin the 3rd vs. Detective Conan: The Movie (2013) – Sonoko Suzuki
Pretty Cure All Stars New Stage 3: Eternal Friends (2014) - Ribbon
HappinessCharge PreCure! the Movie: The Ballerina of the Land of Dolls (2014) - Ribbon
Pretty Cure All Stars: Spring Carnival (2015) - Ribbon
Detective Conan: Sunflowers of Inferno (2015) – Sonoko Suzuki
Pretty Cure All Stars: Singing with Everyone Miraculous Magic (2016) - Ribbon

Video games
Efera & Jiliora: The Emblem From Darkness (xxxx) – Efera
Terra Phantastica (xxxx) – Dine
Super Heroine Chronicle (xxxx) – Rem Ayanokōji
Magical Drop F (xxxx) – Fortune / Devil
EVE new generation (2006) – Kyoko Himuro
Project X Zone 2 (2015) – Byaku Shin
Tokyo Afterschool Summoners (2017) – Protagonist / Christine / Ikutoshi / Kagutsuchi / Arachne
Eve: Ghost Enemies (2022) – Kyouko Himuro

Dubbing

Live-action
Frasier – Daphne Moon (Jane Leeves)
French Kiss (1997 NTV edition) – Kate (Meg Ryan)
Ghost (1999 TV Asahi edition) – Molly Jensen (Demi Moore)
Melrose Place – Alison Parker (Courtney Thorne-Smith)

Animation
Chip 'n Dale Rescue Rangers - Gadget Hackwrench
Totally Spies! – Sam
The Powerpuff Girls – Bunny

References

External links
 

1961 births
Living people
Voice actors from Hakodate
Voice actresses from Hokkaido
Japanese video game actresses
Japanese voice actresses
20th-century Japanese actresses
21st-century Japanese actresses
Production Baobab voice actors
Japanese sopranos